The canton of Montpellier-1 is an administrative division of the Hérault department, southern France. Its borders were modified at the French canton reorganisation which came into effect in March 2015. Its seat is in Montpellier.

Composition 

It consists of the following communes:
Grabels
Montpellier (partly)

Councillors

Pictures of the canton

External links 
 Canton of Montpellier-1 Web site

References 

Cantons of Hérault